Devale Ellis (born April 2, 1984, in Brooklyn, New York) is an American actor and former American football wide receiver. He was signed by the Detroit Lions as an undrafted free agent in 2006. He played college football at Hofstra.

Personal life
He is married to Khadeen Ellis and together they have four sons: Jackson (b. 2011), Kairo (b. 2016), Kaz (b. 2017) and Dakota (b. 2021).

Devale and Khadeen have a comedy filled YouTube channel called "The Ellises" where they showcase their family vlogs and skits.

In 2019, they created a podcast called “Dead Ass” together where they share stories, opinions and give advice on love, marriage and business. Since 2019, he has starred as Zac in the television series Sistas.

High school career
Devale attended James Madison High School in Brooklyn, New York, where he played football and basketball. In his senior year at Madison, he lit up the Public School Athletic League. He was in the top ten for catches made and in the top ten for touchdowns made by a wide receiver. He also played in the PSAL all star game. During the season, he earned the nickname Devale "Show Time" Ellis.

College career
He attended Hofstra University, where he was a teammate of New Orleans Saints wide receiver Marques Colston. Ellis finished his career with 176 catches for 2,207 yards (a 12.5 per-catch average) and 22 touchdowns. As a senior in 2005, he led Hofstra with 74 receptions for 943 yards and five touchdowns.  He ranked second in the Atlantic 10 in receptions, third in receiving yards and ninth in all-purpose yards (103.8 yards per game).  As a junior, with Colston sidelined all season with an injury, Ellis led the team ranked second in the Atlantic 10 and 11th in I-AA with 74 catches, good for 1,067 yards (a 14.4 average) and 13 touchdowns.

Football career

Detroit Lions
He went undrafted in the 2006 NFL Draft, but was signed as a free agent after participating in the rookie mini-camp as a tryout player. He was signed to the Lions eight man practice squad on September 3, 2006. Although he played in the season opener against the Seattle Seahawks on the September 9th, he was waived from the active roster on September 11, and shortly afterwards re-signed with the practice squad. As of October 15, he had been upgraded to the active roster and made his first start against the Buffalo Bills. Ellis was waived by the Lions during final cuts on August 30, 2008.

Cleveland Browns
After spending the 2008 regular season out of football, Ellis was signed to a future contract by the Cleveland Browns on December 31, 2008. He was waived on July 26, 2009.

Filmography

Film

Television

References

External links
Cleveland Browns bio
Detroit Lions bio
 

1984 births
Living people
Sportspeople from Brooklyn
Players of American football from New York City
American football wide receivers
American football return specialists
Hofstra Pride football players
Detroit Lions players
Cleveland Browns players
James Madison High School (Brooklyn) alumni
American male film actors
American male television actors
Male actors from New York (state)
21st-century American male actors